Shankar–Jaikishan (also known as S-J), were an Indian composer duo of the Hindi film industry, working together from 1949 to 1971. They are widely considered to be one of the greatest ever music composers of the Hindi film industry. After Jaikishan’s death in 1971, Shankar continued as a music director alone until his own death in 1987. During this solo career, he was still credited as 'Shankar–Jaikishan'.

Shankar–Jaikishan, along with other artists, composed "everlasting" and "immortal melodies" in the 1950s, 1960s, and early 1970s. Their best work was noted for being "raga-based and having both lilt and sonority".

Early years

Shankar 

Shankar Singh Ram Singh Raghuvanshi (15 October 1922 – 26 April 1987) was from Hyderabad. During his formative years, Shankar played the tabla and learned the art formally from Baba Nasir Khansahib. For many years, Shankar studied as a disciple of the legendary composer Khawaja Khurshid Anwar, in whose orchestra he performed. 
Shankar started his career with a theater group run by Satyanarayan and Hemawati, before shifting to Prithvi Theatre where he played tabla and performed some minor roles in plays. It was at Prithvi Theatre that he learnt to play and mastered several other instruments like Sitar, Accordion and Piano etc. Besides his work at Prithvi Theatre, he also started working as an assistant to the leading composer duo of Husnlal Bhagatram and nurtured the ambition of becoming an independent music director.

Jaikishan 

Jaikishan Dayabhai Panchal (4 November 1929 – 12 September 1971) was born to Dahyabhai Panchal and his wife. As a child he lived in Bansda (Vansada), a town in the present-day state of Gujarat. Jaikishan was adept at playing the harmonium. Subsequently, he obtained his musical lessons from Sangeet Visharad Wadilalji and later from Prem Shankar Nayak. After moving to Mumbai, he became a disciple of Vinayak Tambe.

Formation of the composer duo 

Apart from working at Prithvi Theatre, Shankar used to frequently visit the office of a Gujarati director, Chandravadan Bhatt, who had promised Shankar a break as composer when he produced a film. It was outside the office of Bhatt, that Shankar saw Jaikishan a number of times. He started a conversation one day and discovered that Jaikishan was a harmonium player, and also visiting the same producer in search of work. Shankar later recollected that they developed a liking for each other and it was he who then and there assured Jaikishan of the job of a harmonium player at Prithvi Theatre (without asking Prithviraj Kapoor, fondly referred to as 'Papaji'). Papaji honoured Shankar's selection and gladly accepted Jaikishan as a harmonium player at Prithvi. Soon, the two developed very close friendship to the extent that the people started to referring them 'Ram-Lakshman' and by several similar-meaning nicknames. Apart from following their musical pursuits, they also used to play significant roles in various plays including the famous play Pathan.

While working in Prithvi Theatre, Shankar and Jaikishan used to compose tunes and were in touch with Raj Kapoor, who was working as an assistant to the famous director Kidar Sharma and was aspiring to be an actor/director. Thus, the three had met at Prithvi Theatre.

Barsaat: the first break
Raj Kapoor made his debut as a director with the film Aag in 1948. Its music director Ram Ganguly was assisted by Shankar and Jaikishan. However, during the recording of a song for his new venture Barsaat, Raj Kapoor had some serious differences with Ram Ganguly and decided to assign its music to Shankar who insisted on taking Jaikishan as his partner. Thus came into existence the new pair of music directors 'Shankar-Jaikishan' who would become a permanent feature in Raj Kapoor films in near future.

Himself being a trained singer (he and Mukesh learned vocal music from the same Guru), Raj Kapoor thus took on board this new team of composers Shankar and Jaikishan with lyricists Shailendra and Hasrat Jaipuri (a former bus conductor). On the insistence of Shankar, they co-opted the upcoming singing talent Lata Mangeshkar, and repeated Mukesh as Raj Kapoor's ghost voice for the songs of Barsaat.

The film also had the distinction of featuring two firsts in Hindi cinema — a title song ("Barsaat Mein Humse Mile") and a cabaret ("Patli Kamar Hai"), which were also the first two songs written by Shailendra.

Early works between 1949 and 1959
The two became known by the acronym "S-J".

Their early works include  Barsaat, Awara, Badal, Poonam, Nagina, Aurat, Parbat, Kali Ghata, Aah, Patita, Shikast, Badshah, Mayurpankh, Naya Ghar, Seema, Shree 420, Basant Bahar, Halaku, Rajhath, New Delhi, Kathputli, Anari, Chori Chori, Daag, Begunah, Yahudi, Main Nashe Mein Hoon, Kanhaiya, Boot Polish, Choti Behan, Shararat, Love Marriage and Ujala.

Musical collaborators
S-J formed a core team with lyricists Shailendra (himself regarded as perhaps the greatest modern day Hindi film music lyricist) and Hasrat Jaipuri and with singers Mohammed Rafi, Lata Mangeshkar and Asha Bhosle. SJ had two other lifelong companions who worked as their assistants: Dattaram Wadkar and Sebastian D'Souza, the former supervising their rhythm section and the latter writing musical notations for all SJ compositions (during SJ's musical sittings as can be seen in a number of photographs of such sessions) and then rehearsing all the musicians of the grand SJ orchestra according to SJ's compositions and directions. SJ also patronized the immensely talented singer Manna Dey, who sang his best songs with them and used Mukesh's silken voice as playback for Raj Kapoor. Among the directors, they worked most closely with Raj Kapoor and were considered the kingpins of his legendary banner RK Films.

They were commercial geniuses in addition to be wonderfully god-blessed in music. They led the Bollywood music in spite of tough competition from maestros like Naushad, C Ramchandra, Roshan, SD Burman, OP Nayyar, Salil Choudhury and Madan Mohan and remained on the top much to the chagrin of very highly talented music directors.

S-J worked with almost all singers of their time. They had a good working relationship with all of them and were masters in extracting the very best from every one of them. They were steady as a team with Hasrat Jaipuri and Shailendra as their lyricists; but after the demise of Shailendra, they worked with a host of other lyricists such as Indeevar, Gulshan Bawra, Gopaldas Neeraj, Verma Malik, Majrooh Sultanpuri, Vithhal Bhai Patel and Rajinder Krishan, to name a few.

S-J were the "house composers" for RK Films and were on their payroll till the end. Raj Kapoor used to maintain a music bank where he stored compositions of S-J.  Even after the termination of the professional association between Shankar and Raj Kapoor (Jaikishan had died by then), the latter had used a number of S-J's earlier compositions (which were in his custody) for all his films though the credits were given officially to other composers, e.g., Laxmikant-Pyarelal (Bobby, Satyam Shivam Sundaram, Prem Rog) and Ravindra Jain (Ram Teri Ganga Maili). S-J also worked with other stars like Kishore Kumar, Shammi Kapoor, Rajendra Kumar, Dev Anand, Sunil Dutt, Manoj Kumar, Biswajeet, Joy Mukherjee and Dharmendra. Beside them S-J combo worked above all with Mohammed Rafi and secondly Mukesh, and produced numbers of hits and unmatchable gems. Mohammed Rafi was their favourite singer despite having good reputation with other playback singers of the time.

Most of S-J's films show Dattaram and Sebastian as their assistants. Dattaram handled the percussion section of the orchestra while Sebastian handled the rest.  Dattaram met Shankar in a Gym when the latter was already working at Prithvi Theatre as a musician. After listening to Shankar's Tabla at the Gym and being highly impressed by his virtuosity, Dattaram became his disciple and remained with S-J throughout. As recalled by Dattaram, Sebastian used to write the musical notations of S-J's compositions and also conducted the orchestra.

Composition style

Shankar-Jaikishan's compositions broke new ground in Hindi film music. Apart from relying upon their knowledge of Indian classical music, they also employed western beats and orchestration. Shankar-Jaikishan were the pioneers in establishing the role of the orchestra in song compositions as a medium to express and enhance the meanings and feelings of songs rather than using it just as a `filler' as per the prevalent practice before their advent on the scene. They made use of the orchestra and musical instruments (often dozens or hundreds of them) in their songs which consisted of the following format: The song starts with a `prelude' (preparatory music to create and introduce the environment and mood for the beginning of the song), then the mukhda starts and is followed by 'interlude' containing music pieces on the orchestra. With very few exceptions ("Ye mera deewana pan hai" is a good example), they always used different interludes before each stanza. 'Multi-layered music studded with counter melodies' played by the orchestra accompanied while the mukhda or the antara of a song was being sung and finally came the `epilogue' – the music with which the song ended after the singer(s) had finished their singing.

Shankar-Jaikishan made a significant contribution in promoting Indian classical music throughout their career. It was their established practice to have at least one song in a movie based on semi-classical style. These included songs like `Jhanak-jhanak tori baje payaliya' (Mere Huzoor), `Chham chham baje re payaliya' (Jane-anjane), `Radhike tune bansari churayi' (Beti Bete), `Manmohana bade jhoothe' (old `Seema'), `Koi matwala aya mere dware' (Love in Tokyo), `Ajahu na ayae baalma, sawan beeta jaye' (Sanjh aur Savera), `Lapak jhapak tu aa re badarwa' (Boot polish), `Ye barkha bahar sautaniya ke dwar' (Mayur pankh), `Re man sur mein ga' (Lal pathar), `Sooni sooni sans ke sitar par' (Lal Patthar), `Kate na kate raina' (Mera naam joker), Hone Lagi Hai Raat Jawaan ( Naina) and numerous others. Their music in both `Basant Bahar' and Amrapali had every song based upon Indian classical music. While "raga Bhairavi" remained their perennial favorite, SJ used a variety of Raagas in their compositions.

Shankar Jaikishan also used the western classical-based waltz rhythm in a number of songs.

Shankar-Jaikishan gave a new style and meaning to the genre of sad songs by composing them on a fast tempo. Songs like "Zindagi Mein Hardam Rota Hi Raha" (Barsaat), "Tera Jana Dil Ke Armanon" (Anari), "Haye Tu Hi Gaya Mohe Bhool Re" (Kathputli), "Aye Mere Dil Kahin Aur Chal' (Daag) and "Andhe Jahan Ke Andhe Raate" (Patita) demonstrated this. The last two songs, along with many others (notably "Awaara Hoon" from the film Awaara), also demonstrate the composers’ use of musical instruments – a harmonium is used to produce the effect of a piano accordion.

Working styles: 'SJ' were two composers in one name

While working as a team, Shankar and Jaikishan used to compose their songs separately. Generally, Shankar liked to work with Shailendra and Jaikishan with Hasrat Jaipuri though there are notable instances where Shankar worked with Hasrat and Jaikishan with Shailendra. Of course there are a number of songs done jointly in which both of them contributed. Between the two, Shankar was the senior partner and hence, he would usually arrange the orchestra, even for Jaikishan's songs. There was a gentleman's agreement between them for not identifying the actual composer of the song. As a result, it has been a popular pastime for S-J aficionados to try to tell a Shankar song from a Jaikishan song. Dance numbers, title/theme songs and soulful songs were Shankar's forte while Jaikishan was a master of composing background score, apart from romantic songs (he is generally regarded as the best ever in this genre) and simple, catchy compositions which became instant hits ("Ehsaan Mere Dil Pe" being a typical example of such songs). However, Shankar was no smaller in this aspect of devising simple 'straight line' tunes: "Mera Joota Hai Japani" (Shri 420, 1955), Yeh Mera Deewanapan Hai (Yahudi, 1958) Awaara Hoon (Awaara, 1951), Kisi ke Muskurahaton (Anari, 1959), also being the best example of this genre.

It is said that Jaikishan would count some numbers on his fingers before coming up with the background score for a particular scene on the spot! Two of S-J's films, viz., Sangam (1964) and Mera Naam Joker (1971) are regarded even today as having some of the best background musical scores of Hindi films till date. Although, by and large, it was Jaikishan who used to work on background music of SJ movies as per their mutually agreed division of work, it may be an over-simplification to presume that therefore, whatever went in background scores was solely Jaikishan's creation. Since SJ had a common pool of tunes in their stock, made by either of them during their numerous music sessions/sittings (Riyaz), it was perfectly legitimate and natural for Jaikishan to have used tunes created by Shankar also wherever needed. This is also one of the reasons why he was able to finish this job in a few days' time. It is understood that in RK films, Shankar and Jaikishan both used to work on the background scores. On the other hand, both Shankar and Jaikishan were equally proficient in scoring western music based songs.

Despite their distinct working styles and preferences, it is very difficult, if not altogether impossible, to ascribe most of their songs to only one of them. In most of the songs, they invariably contributed to one another's creation, either in the form of improvisation of tune or of orchestration, thus, making their compositions truly a joint effort. Furthermore, each of the two could compose in the other's style now and then thereby making the identification still more difficult.

Contrary to the popular mis-conception that 'it was Jaikishan who used to handle the public relations and business/financial aspects of the duo's career', the fact is that it was Shankar who had the final say on all financial/business aspects of the SJ-team. After Jaikishan's very early death in September 1971, Shankar flew the SJ flag which had been rampant in Bollywood ever since Barsaat's release in 1949. However, he was never able to regain the popularity that Shankar - Jaikishan once enjoyed after Jaikishan's death.

Raaga-jazz style

Shankar Jaikishan made a major contribution towards the development of jazz music in India and the new genre Indo jazz. Their 1968 album Raaga-Jazz style is the earliest Indo-jazz recording in India. In this album, considered to be one of the most innovative, SJ created 11 songs based on Indian Ragas with saxophone, trumpet, sitar (by Rais Khan), tabla, bass etc.

Awards

During their career, S-J won Filmfare Best Music Director Awards nine times. The last three awards were won in three successive years, thereby making S-J the first composers to score a hat trick of these awards.

S-J also came out tops in Binaca Geetmala, the legendary countdown radio program on Hindi film music, where their compositions were declared the most popular on six occasions (a record later equalled by Laxmikant Pyarelal). These songs were "Mera Joota Hai Japani" in 1955 (Shree 420), "Teri Pyari Pyari Surat Ko" in 1961 (Sasural), "Ehsaan Tera Hoga Mujh Par" in 1962 (Junglee), "Bol Radha Bol" in 1964 (Sangam), "Baharon Phool Barsaao" in 1966 (Suraj), and "Zindagi Ek Safar Hai Suhana" in 1971 (Andaaz). In 1959, seven of the top ten songs for the year were composed by S-J, a sort of record that stands perhaps to this date, though the top honours for that year went to SD Burman.

Government recognitions
 1968 – Shankar-Jaikishan was honoured with the Padmashri by the Government of India.
 2013 – A postage stamp, bearing their face, was released by India Post to honour them on 3 May 2013.

Filmfare Awards
 FILMFARE AWARD STARTED DURING 1954 FOR BEST MUSIC DIRECTOR
Winner

Nominated

The Sur-Singar Awards
Winner
 1968 – For the song "Jhanak Jhanak Toree Baje Payaliya" of the film Mere Huzoor
 1971 – For the song "Re Man Sur Mein Ga"of the film Lal Patthar

Bengal Film Journalists' Association Awards
Winner
 1968 – Best Music Director for the film Brahmachari
 1971 – Best Music Director for the film Andaz

Alleged disputes between Shankar and Jaikishan

In a signed article in Filmfare, Jaikishan identified unwittingly the song "Yeh Mera Prem Patra Padh Kar" (Sangam) as his composition. This led to a lot of bitterness between the two, as Shankar considered it a violation of the unwritten agreement between them. At about the same time, Shankar gave a break to singer Sharda and started promoting her as the new singing sensation in preference over Lata Mangeshkar. Jaikishan, however, stuck to Lata Mangeshkar for his compositions. In this period, Shankar and Jaikishan started taking individual contracts for films though every such film continued to show them together as the composers. Mohd. Rafi intervened and helped them settle their differences; however, it is conjectured that their relationship was not the same as earlier and this impacted the quality of their compositions which had started exhibiting a decline (which is clearly noticeable in the movies released during the last phases of Jaikishan's lifetime and those released just after his demise).

On the other hand, Jaikishan, Hasrat and Shankar all had denied, whenever quizzed on this topic, that there ever was any rift between them. In fact, according to Hasrat, the division of work was by mutual agreement to cope up with the heavy work load so that Shankar and Shailendra looked after one part of the work while Jaikishan and Hasrat on the other part but this division was not rigid; there was a lot of give and take between them even during this phase. Towards the end (just before Jaikishan's untimely demise), in several of their last movies such as Jane Anjane (1971), Andaaz (1971), Ankhon Ankhon Mein, Shankar and Jaikishan were known to be working together. In retrospect, it appears that the so-called rift between Shankar and Jaikishan was blown out of proportion by the media and vested interests and was used later to downgrade Shankar in his post-Jaikishan years.

Since Shankar continued to support Sharda (post Sangam era) and even ghost-composed music for her film and non-film albums, it is said that Lata Mangeshkar became angry with him and discontinued singing for him. Whereas there may be some truth in this assertion, the other fact is that Lata Mangeshkar had stopped working with him after Sangam due to her anger against both Raj Kapoor and Shankar in making her sing "Budhha Mil Gaya" from Sangam which she was not keen as she did not feel comfortable with the lyrics of the song. Later on she sang in Sanyasi, Duniyadari and Atmaram. Nevertheless, she continued singing for Jaikishan even after Sangam and till the end.

Standing in the industry

S-J enjoyed an unrivalled position in the Hindi film industry. During their heyday and even toward the later part of their career, they were the highest paid music directors in the industry. Barring stray exceptions, they were paid more than the leading actors and the promotional material of their films would give them more prominence than anyone else.

Jaikishan's death and SJ's post-Jaikishan era

Jaikishan died on 12 September 1971 due to cirrhosis of liver, a disease caused by excessive consumption of alcohol. At the time of his death, the duo enjoyed an unparalleled popularity which was underlined by a massive turnout at his funeral procession. Gaylord, a restaurant at Churchgate (Mumbai) where Jaikishan used to be a regular visitor, mourned the death of its illustrious patron by lighting a candle on his favorite table for one month and keeping it out of bounds for other guests with the sign "Reserved for Mr. Jaikishan".

After Jaikishan's death, Shankar carried on with the banner of Shankar-Jaikishan alone (as per their mutual understanding made during their lifetime that in case of the demise of any one of them, the surviving partner will continue to work with the same team name). He was clearly hampered by numerous reasons such as the departures of his soul-mate Jaikishan and his favourite lyricist Shailendra, the continued Shankar-bashing and false propaganda by his rivals and lack of motivation on his own part due to which his music appeared to suffer in comparison to S-J's own high standards. Also, in spite of his continued experimentation on music, the projects themselves for which he worked did not turn out to be commercial successes due to which even his good scores went largely unnoticed. After 1970, when Raj Kapoor's personal project Mera Naam Joker did not do very well, he became superstitious and thought that this was because Lata Mangeshkar did not sing in the film. Lata got on very well with Jaikishan but not with Shankar, and Raj Kapoor  chose Lata over Shankar. This was ironic, as Lata's big break was in the 1949 superhit Barsaat, where Shankar and Jaikishan were the music directors.

According to Lata Mangeshkar herself, it was the late Mohd. Rafi who brought about a rapprochement between the two and she did start singing again for Shankar starting from Sohan Lal Kanwar's `Sanyasi' and several other films later. Although Shankar's creations during this period for Lata as well as other singers like Kishore, Rafi, Manna Dey were quite good, most of these went unnoticed due to non-descript status of such films which bombed at the box office. His most-successful musical hit was Sanyasi in 1975 for which he scored all songs and the entire background score based upon SJ's favorite Raag Bhairavi to prove the point that SJ's Bhairavi was as much Shankar's as that of Jaikishan.

After Sanyasi, although some of Shankar's later songs did exhibit flashes of the old maestro's brilliance, overall, these films (Aatmaram, Do-Jhooth, Garam Khoon, Papi Pet Ka Sawal Hai, Chorni, Eint ka Jawab Pathar) did not succeed in endearing him to leading production houses, though there were some exceptions. For example, actor Dharmendra had signed Shankar to compose the score for his film Bichchoo, however, since Shankar did not accept Sai's (who was more keen in having Raj Kamal as MD) interference in his work, he opted out of the project. Eventually, the project itself was abandoned by Dharmendra.

Shankar was in the running for Raj Kapoor's film Satyam Shivam Sundaram (1978), but was overlooked in favour of Laxmikant Pyarelal whose candidature was supported vigorously by Mukesh. Ironically, Mukesh owed his standing in the film industry primarily to S-J's compositions.

Shankar was also considered for Raj Kapoor's proposed film Param Vir Chakra (his case was supported by Raj Kapoor's sons), but the project did not see the light of day and Shankar never returned to the RK camp.

Shankar's death 

Shankar died in 1987. His death received little media coverage and his funeral was attended only by his family and some friends. The film industry was hardly present at his funeral, thus reinforcing the stereotype of its fickle-natured loyalties, when compared to Jaikishan's death in 1971, which drew the entire film industry. After Shankar died, the nearly 40 year old SJ banner came to an end, which was the end of what is widely regarded as the best music direction in Bollywood history.

Raj Kapoor later paid glowing tributes to Shankar in a televised interview. However, it was only after Raj Kapoor's own death in 1988 that the significance of his association with Shankar–Jaikishan was brought out in great detail.

Chandrakant Bhosle first noticed Shankar, as Shankar was popularly known among his friends, in Mumbai in 1945 when Shankarji arrived in Mumbai with ballet troupe of guru Krishnankutty and dancer Hemawati. Bhosle was a tabla player and had become closely associated with Shankar. He used to play rhythm in Shankar's orchestra from 1949 until Shankar's death. On the night of April 25, 1987, Shankar dropped Bhosle near Charni Road railway station where Bhosle stayed and drove off to his own residence at Churchgate. On 26 April Bhosle was, as usual, waiting for Shankar at around 10.00 a.m. to take him to the studio, but Shankar did not turn up so Bhosle went to the studio by taxi. All the musicians waited the whole day for Shankar in the studio but he did not turn up. The next day, Bhosle read the news of Shankar's death. Unfortunately, family members with whom Shankar was staying did not inform Bhosle, Raj Kapoor or anybody from the film fraternity about Shankar's death.

It was Mr. Gokhale, who was once a cook in Shankarji's house, who later became Pujari in Gora Ram Mandir at Thakurdwar, Mumbai, who informed people that Shankarji was cremated hastily on the day of his death, without the knowledge of others

Achievements
 Their regular lyricists were Shailendra, Hasrat Jaipuri. They wrote maximum number of songs for them.
 They also worked with lyricists like Anand Bakshi, Indeevar, Neeraj, Anjaan, Varma Malik, Ramesh Shastri, Jalal Malihabadi, Gulzar, Prem Dhawan, VisheshwAr Sharma, Vitthal Bhai Patel, MG Hashmat, Singer, Virendra Mishra, Majrooh Sultanpuri, Bharat vyas, Kaifi Azmi, Rajendra Krishna, Farooq Kaiser, Nida Faili.
 They were regular composers for Raj Kapoor's banner, RK Films from the start of their career till 1971 (Jaikishan's death).
 Barsaat has been rated the best soundtrack ever by Planet Bollywood on their "100 Greatest Bollywood Soundtracks". Other soundtrack in the list include Awaara (3), Sangam (8), Shree 420 (15) Junglee (18), Chori Chori (19), Mera Naam Joker (48), Suraj (86), Jis Desh Mein Ganga Behti Hai (88), Anari (92).

Discography

See also
Dattaram Wadkar

References and further reading

Further reading

External links

 
 
 Shankar-Jaikishan Emperors of Music
 Tribute to SJ
 Shankar Jaikishan Biography, music database and blog
 Authentic information, features and collection of features
 Library of photos of Shankar-Jaikishan, Shailendra-Hasrat

Filmfare Awards winners
Indian jazz musicians
Indian musical duos
Harmonium players
Hindi film score composers
Telugu film score composers
20th-century Indian composers
Recipients of the Padma Shri in arts